Chu Hui (born ) is a Chinese male volleyball player. He was part of the China men's national volleyball team at the 2002 FIVB Volleyball Men's World Championship in Argentina.

Clubs
 Liaoning, China (2001 - 2009)
 Retired and as an assistant coach of Shandong women's club (2009 - 2012)
 Beijing, China (2012 - 2018)
 Retired and as an assistant coach of Beijing women's coach (2018–present)

References

1981 births
Living people
Chinese men's volleyball players
Place of birth missing (living people)
21st-century Chinese people